The following radio stations broadcast on FM frequency 88.9 MHz:

Argentina

 Radio 360 in Gualeguaychú, Entre Ríos
 Atalaya in Berazategui, Buenos Aires
 Bella Italia in Rafaela, Santa Fe
 Bemba in Villa María, Córdoba
 Cadena 3 Argentina in Venado Tuerto, Santa Fe
 Chabas "La Nueva Voz" in Chabás, Santa Fe
 Classic in Resistencia, Chaco
 Cooperativa in Inriville, Córdoba
 Cristal in Oberá, Misiones
 Del sol in Pigüé, Buenos Aires
 Eclipse in Torcuato, Buenos Aires
 Gran Rosario in Rosario, Santa Fe
 La 88 in Alta Gracia, Córdoba
 LRS851 Alejandra in Alejandra, Santa Fe
 El Nacional in Trenque Lauquen, Buenos Aires
 Light in Posadas, Misiones
 Munizipium in Zárate, Buenos Aires
 Namunkurá in Puerto Madryn, Chubut
 Oid Mortales in Concordia, Entre Ríos
 Pobre Johnny in Córdoba
 Radio 8 in Santa Clara de Buena Vista, Santa Fe
 Radio María in Daireaux, Buenos Aires
 Radio María in San Fernando del Valle de Catamarca, Catamarca
 Radio María in Santa María, Catamarca
 Radio María in San Miguel, Corrientes
 Radio María in La Paz, Entre Ríos
 Raíces Rock in La Plata, Buenos Aires
 Renuevo Radio in Buenos Aires
 Signos in San Carlos de Bolívar, Provincia de Buenos Aires
 Sur in Quilmes, Buenos Aires
 Suyay in Neuquén 
 U in San Nicolás De Los Arroyos, Buenos Aires
 Universidad in Lujan, Buenos Aires
 Radio FM Cumbiambera in Salta

Australia 
 88.9 FM, Richmond Valley Radio Bora Ridge, Far North Coast, New South Wales
 2YOU in Tamworth, New South Wales
 2RSR in Sydney, New South Wales
 SBS Radio in Bathurst, New South Wales
 5HR in Mount Barker, South Australia
 Triple J in Queenstown, Tasmania
 3HFM in Hamilton, Victoria
 WYN-FM in Melbourne, Victoria

Belize
Love FM at Caye Caulker

Canada (Channel 205) 

 CBAL-FM-3 in Campbellton, New Brunswick
 CBAX-FM-1 in Charlottetown, Prince Edward Island
 CBPO-FM in Parry Sound, Ontario
 CBTK-FM in Kelowna, British Columbia
 CBUX-FM-1 in Victoria, British Columbia
 CBVX-FM-3 in Baie St-Paul, Quebec
 CBWU-FM in Cranberry Portage, Manitoba
 CFNJ-FM-1 in St. Zenon, Quebec
 CHNI-FM in Saint John, New Brunswick
 CHYF-FM in M'Chigeeng First Nation, Ontario
 CIMF-FM-1 in Hawkesbury, Ontario
 CIRV-FM in Toronto, Ontario
 CJMQ-FM in Lennoxville, Quebec
 CJRD-FM in Drummondville, Quebec
 CJSI-FM in Calgary, Alberta
 CKSB-FM-1 in Regina, Saskatchewan
 CKYL-FM-5 in Saddle Hills, Alberta
 VF2385 in Emerson, Manitoba
 VF2386 in Morris, Manitoba
 VF2391 in Portage la Prairie, Manitoba
 VF2392 in Headingley, Manitoba
 VF2413 in North Battleford, Saskatchewan
 VF2425 in Birds Hill Park, Manitoba
 VF2453 in Camp Lisette, Quebec
 VF2511 in Brandon, Manitoba
 VF2512 in Virden, Manitoba
 VF2565 in Salmo, British Columbia
 VF8001 in Shawinigan, Quebec

China 
 former CRI News Radio in Chengdu (changed to air local programme)

Greece 

 Krites 88.9 in Hania Prefecture

Malaysia
 goXuan in Klang Valley and Eastern Pahang
 Nasional FM in Kota Kinabalu, Sabah

Mexico 

 XHAJ-FM in Saltillo, Coahuila
 XHAXA-FM in Oaxaca, Oaxaca
 XHBE-FM in El Progreso, Veracruz
 XHCPBV-FM in La Paz, Baja California Sur
 XHENS-FM in Navojoa, Sonora
 XHESON-FM in Hermosillo, Sonora
 XHFIL-FM in Mazatlán, Sinaloa
 XHIZM-FM in Izúcar de Matamoros, Puebla
 XHKOK-FM in Acapulco, Guerrero
 XHLDO-FM in Nuevo Laredo, Tamaulipas
 XHM-FM in Mexico City
 XHPGVS-FM in Guasave, Sinaloa
 XHPQGA-FM in Quiroga, Michoacán
 XHPTAM-FM in Tamazula de Gordiano, Jalisco
 XHPYAS-FM in Playas de Catazajá, Chiapas
 XHSBC-FM in San Juan Bautista Cuicatlán, Oaxaca
 XHSSA-FM in Sonoita, Sonora
 XHTLJ-FM in Tlaxiaco, Oaxaca
 XHUACC-FM in Ciudad del Carmen, Campeche
 XHXV-FM in Tierra Blanca, Guanajuato

Netherlands 
 Arrow Jazz FM in Maastricht, Limburg

Singapore 
 The BBC World Service transmitting in Singapore

United States (Channel 205) 

 KAIC (FM) in Tucson, Arizona
 KAIP in Wapello, Iowa
 KAIW in Saratoga, Wyoming
  in El Dorado, Arkansas
  in Fort Smith, Arkansas
  in Cache, Oklahoma
  in Yuma, Arizona
 KAWP in Parker, Arizona
 KCHG in Cedar City, Utah
  in Carbondale, Colorado
  in Ellensburg, Washington
  in Visalia, California
 KEFX in Twin Falls, Idaho
 KENM in Tucumcari, New Mexico
 KETR in Commerce, Texas
  in Girdwood, Alaska
  in Redding, California
  in Butte, Montana
  in Great Falls, Montana
 KGLV in Manhattan, Kansas
 KHII in Cloudcroft, New Mexico
 KHJC in Lihue, Hawaii
 KHPS in Uvalde, Texas
 KICJ in Mitchellville, Iowa
 KJGC in Garden City, Kansas
  in Spirit Lake, Iowa
  in Harlingen, Texas
 KJKF in Klamath Falls, Oregon
  in Palmer, Alaska
  in Jefferson City, Missouri
  in Lewiston, Idaho
 KLDN in Lufkin, Texas
 KLLU in Gallup, New Mexico
  in Gillette, Wyoming
 KLVM in Santa Cruz, California
  in Mercer Island, Washington
  in Minot, North Dakota
 KNBE in Beatrice, Nebraska
 KNGM in Guymon, Oklahoma
 KNGW in Juneau, Alaska
 KNMI (FM) in Farmington, New Mexico
 KNPR in Las Vegas, Nevada
  in Collegeville, Minnesota
  in Baker City, Oregon
  in Sheridan, Wyoming
 KOPE in Eldorado, Texas
 KOPO-LP in Paia, Hawaii
 KPJU-LP in El Paso, Texas
 KPLK in Sedro-Woolley, Washington
 KPOV-FM in Bend, Oregon
  in Hays, Kansas
  in Springfield, Oregon
 KQMI in Manzanita, Oregon
  in Fort Collins, Colorado
 KRIQ-FM in Richton, Mississippi
  in Chillicothe, Missouri
  in Las Cruces, New Mexico
 KSDW in Temecula, California
  in Farmington, Missouri
 KSJP in Ipswich, South Dakota
  in Indianola, Iowa
 KSWS in Chehalis, Washington
 KTLW in Lancaster, California
  in Talkeetna, Alaska
 KTSN-FM in Blowout, Texas
 KUAS-FM in Sierra Vista, Arizona
  in Irvine, California
 KUHN in Golden Meadow, Louisiana
 KVMG in Raton, New Mexico
 KVPP in Pago Pago, American Samoa
 KWAA in Mart, Texas
 KWCV in Walnut Ridge, Arkansas
  in Waverly, Iowa
 KWXC in Grove, Oklahoma
  in Los Angeles, California
  in Sacramento, California
 KXWB in Nipomo, California
 KYCL-FM in Clarendon, Texas
 KYFG in Omaha, Nebraska
 KYLF in Adrian, Missouri
  in Oklahoma City, Oklahoma
 KYMR-FM in Metlakatla, Alaska
 KYOR in Newport, Oregon
  in Lockwood, Montana
 KZYK in Santee, Nebraska
 WAJM in Atlantic City, New Jersey
  in Summit, Illinois
  in Steubenville, Ohio
 WBKG (FM) in Macon, Georgia
  in Grand Rapids, Michigan
  in Sellersville, Pennsylvania
  in Pemberton, New Jersey
 WCIJ in Unadilla, New York
  in Canandaigua, New York
 WCRR in Manistique, Michigan
  in Wilberforce, Ohio
  in Richmond, Virginia
  in Fredonia, New York
  in East Lansing, Michigan
  in Miami, Florida
 WDTR in Imlay City, Michigan
  in Baltimore, Maryland
  in Charleston, Illinois
  in Richmond, Kentucky
 WEPS in Elgin, Illinois
  in Boston, Massachusetts
  in Smithtown, New York
  in Edinboro, Pennsylvania
  in Tallahassee, Florida
 WGEN-FM in Monee, Illinois
 WGUR in Milledgeville, Georgia
 WGZR in Alpena, Michigan
  in Tiffin, Ohio
 WHEY in North Muskegon, Michigan
  in Chicago, Illinois
 WILF in Monroeville, Alabama
  in Hartford, Connecticut
 WJTA in Glandorf, Ohio
  in Union City, Indiana
  in The Rock, Georgia
  in Edgewater, Florida
  in North Myrtle Beach, South Carolina
 WKVR in Flint, Michigan
  in Bowling Green, Kentucky
 WLFH in Claxton, Georgia
  in Lincoln, Illinois
  in Rushville, Ohio
  in La Crosse, Wisconsin
 WLXJ in Battle Ground, Indiana
  in Bude, Mississippi
 WMBW in Chattanooga, Tennessee
 WMCX in West Long Branch, New Jersey
  in Oakland, Maine
  in Tuscaloosa, Alabama
 WMSB in Byhalia, Mississippi
 WMSL in Athens, Georgia
  in Miamitown, Ohio
  in Lake Forest, Illinois
 WMYJ-FM in Oolitic, Indiana
  in Rock Hill, South Carolina
 WNYO (FM) in Oswego, New York
 WOJB in Reserve, Wisconsin
  in Ponce, Puerto Rico
  in Fort Pierce, Florida
 WQRN in Cook, Minnesota
  in Selinsgrove, Pennsylvania
  in Ashland, Ohio
 WRKV in Raleigh, North Carolina
  in Port Jervis, New York
  in River Grove, Illinois
  in Staten Island, New York
  in Watertown, New York
  in Notre Dame, Indiana
 WSOH in Zanesfield, Ohio
 WSTB in Streetsboro, Ohio
 WTAI (FM) in Union City, Tennessee
 WTPG in Whitehouse, Ohio
  in Manteo, North Carolina
 WVBA in Brattleboro, Vermont
  in Martinsburg, West Virginia
  in Buckhannon, West Virginia
 WVRN (FM) in Wittenberg, Wisconsin
 WVSI in Mount Vernon, Illinois
 WVWG in Seelyville, Indiana
 WWES in Mt. Kisco, New York
  in Ottawa, Illinois
 WWHN-FM in Irondale, Illinois
  in Brunswick, Georgia
  in New Wilmington, Pennsylvania
  in Tarpon Springs, Florida
 WYMS in Milwaukee, Wisconsin
 WYRR in Lakewood, New York
 WZLC in Summerville, South Carolina

References

Lists of radio stations by frequency